Southworth may refer to:

People
 Southworth (surname)

Places
 Southworth, Ohio, an unincorporated community
 Southworth, Washington – unincorporated community on Puget Sound in Kitsap County, Washington
 Point Southworth – on Kitsap Peninsula on the western side of the northern entrance to Colvos Passage in Puget Sound
 Southworth Creek, a stream in Oregon

Others uses
 Southworth & Hawes – an early photographic firm in Boston.